Robert Dennison (6 March 1912 – 19 June 1994) was an English professional footballer who made 112 appearances in the Football League playing for Newcastle United, Nottingham Forest, Fulham and Northampton Town. He then went into management, with Northampton Town, Middlesbrough, Hereford United and Coventry City, where he was chief scout and spent three months as caretaker manager after Noel Cantwell's dismissal in 1972.

References

1912 births
1996 deaths
People from Amble
Footballers from Northumberland
English footballers
Association football defenders
Newcastle United F.C. players
Nottingham Forest F.C. players
Fulham F.C. players
Northampton Town F.C. players
English Football League players
English football managers
Middlesbrough F.C. players
Hereford United F.C. players
Coventry City F.C. players
English Football League managers
Coventry City F.C. non-playing staff